Cave Spring is a city in Floyd County, Georgia, United States. The population of Cave Spring was 1,200 at the 2010 census, up from 975 at the 2000 census. It is part of the Rome, Georgia Metropolitan Statistical Area.

The town is named for its natural limestone cave and mineral spring site which serves as the main source of drinking water for nearby communities. The spring flows from the cave into a rock holding pond in Rolater Park and then into a  swimming pool constructed of stones. 

Spring water is piped to local homes and businesses by the public-utility service of Cave Spring. Visitors may also bring jugs to fill at the spring and take home for drinking.

Geography
Cave Spring is located in southwestern Floyd County at  (34.108912, -85.336018). U.S. Route 411 passes through the city, leading northeast  to Rome and west  to Gadsden, Alabama. Georgia State Route 100 leads north from Cave Spring  to Coosa and southeast  to Cedartown.

History 

The town of Cave Spring dates to 1832, but the community is much older. Historically, indigenous peoples of the area (both Cherokee and the earlier Mississippian culture) used the site for drinking water, tribal meetings, and games, according to legend. 

The town was founded in 1832 by Baptists who were among its early settlers. It takes its name from a clear water spring which still serves as the main source of drinking water for Cave Spring and nearby communities. The water is now delivered by a modern pumping system and has won awards for purity and taste. 

The spring flows from its source inside the cave into a small rock  pool or open reservoir, separated from a larger duck pond. Both ponds are located just outside the cave entrance, which is fronted by a man-made rock wall. These improvements were added as part of Rolater Park, named in 1921. 

The wall encloses a lobby leading to the natural cave entrance, which widens to a larger cavity. The cave features limestone formations; one, a large stalagmite, is named the Devil's Stool. There is also a manmade staircase inside the cave for those who want to view the formations from above. 

The park site was formerly used by educational institutions such as Cave Spring Manual Labor School (renamed Hearn Academy) and others including Georgia School for the Deaf. During the Atlanta Campaign of the Civil War in 1864, both Confederate and Union troops came to Cave Spring for hospitalization and rest.

Cave Spring has historic homes and buildings from its early years, such as the 1867 Presbyterian Church, 1880 train depot, and 19th century hotels and boarding houses.

Government and infrastructure
Its city hall is Fannin Hall, formerly part of the Georgia School for the Deaf. It was renovated and reopened in 2015.

Demographics

2020 census

As of the 2020 United States census, there were 1,174 people, 459 households, and 260 families residing in the city.

2000 census
As of the census of 2000, there were 975 people, 404 households, and 281 families residing in the city. The racial makeup of the city was 84.82% White, 12.41% African American, 0.62% Native American, 0.10% Pacific Islander, 1.44% from other races, and 0.62% from two or more races. Hispanic or Latino of any race were 2.15% of the population.

There were 404 households, out of which 28.2% had children under the age of 18 living with them, 52.0% were married couples living together, 14.9% had a female householder with no husband present, and 30.2% were non-families. 29.5% of all households were made up of individuals, and 15.3% had someone living alone who was 65 years of age or older.  The average household size was 2.36 and the average family size was 2.89.

In the city, the population was spread out, with 23.7% under the age of 18, 5.1% from 18 to 24, 23.8% from 25 to 44, 24.5% from 45 to 64, and 22.9% who were 65 years of age or older. The median age was 44 years. For every 100 females, there were 83.3 males. For every 100 females age 18 and over, there were 75.5 males.

The median income for a household in the city was $33,750, and the median income for a family was $47,917. Males had a median income of $35,395 versus $20,962 for females. The per capita income for the city was $17,850.  About 14.0% of families and 15.1% of the population were below the poverty line, including 22.6% of those under age 18 and 13.9% of those age 65 or over.

Education
Cave Spring is within the Floyd County School District. The district operates Cave Spring Elementary School. The zoned middle and high schools serving Cave Spring are Coosa Middle School and Coosa High School.

Cave Spring is the home of the Georgia School for the Deaf, established in 1846. It is a state-funded residential school operating under the auspices of the Office of Special Services of the Georgia State Department of Education and the Georgia State Board of Education. It aims to ensure that appropriate educational programs are available for hearing-impaired and multi-handicapped hearing-impaired students residing in Georgia. GSD was once a field hospital for both Confederate and Union troops during the Civil War.

Notable residents
Horace Alton White was born in Cave Spring

References

External links

 City of Cave Spring official website
 Georgia School for the Deaf

Cities in Georgia (U.S. state)
Cities in Floyd County, Georgia
Springs of Georgia (U.S. state)